Thomas W. Laputka (born December 30, 1947) is an American retired gridiron football player who played for the Ottawa Rough Riders and Edmonton Eskimos. He won the Grey Cup with Ottawa in 1973, and with Edmonton in 1975. He played college football at Southern Illinois University. Heis also a retired businessman and served as a councilman and in 2011 was elected mayor of Orange City, Florida, serving through the end of 2016.

Political career
Laputka served as a councilman representing District 6; he decided to run for mayor in 2011. He was able to win in the general election defeating the incumbent mayor Harley Strickland. He served as the mayor of Orange City, Florida from November 2011 – 2016 after resigning from office  to run for Volusia County Chairman; against three other opponents in the race (incumbent chairman Jason Davis, Greg Gimbert of Daytona Beacon, and Ormond Beach mayor Ed Kelley). Later in the race, he did not win enough votes to make into the general election like Kelly and Davis did that year.

References

Living people
1947 births
American players of Canadian football
Canadian football defensive linemen
People from Orange City, Florida
Politicians from Philadelphia
Mayors of places in Florida
Edmonton Elks players
Southern Illinois Salukis football players
Southern Illinois University Carbondale alumni
Players of American football from Philadelphia
Philadelphia Bell players